Laylat al-Raghaib is a night of prayer in Islamic practice, classed in Turkish tradition as one of the five blessed Kandil nights. Observance of this night differs among Muslims in the world. It is mostly practiced by Muslims influenced by Sufism, such as Muslims in Turkey and Muslim Balkan communities today, and Shia Muslims, while Sunnis in the Arab world pays little attention (although it originated in the Levant), and Salafis dismiss it entirely. Views on the permissibility of observing it also differ among Muslim scholars, and have been the subject of repeated debates over the past millennium. The practice has variously been rejected as bid'ah (unacceptable innovation) by the four major Sunni Madhhab, Shafi’i, Hanbali, Hanafi, and Maliki jurists, or defended as bid'ah hasanah (meritorious innovation). 

Raghaib is derived from the root of the verb word "ra-gha-ba" meaning "to desire" or "to tend toward". 

Laylat al-Raghaib marks the beginning of the "Three holy months" (Rajab, Sha'ban and leading to Ramazan) in the Hijri calendar. As Islamic holidays begin the night before, Laylat al-Raghaib is celebrated on the Thursday night preceding the first Friday of the month of Rajab. Followers of this tradition believe that if, on the first Thursday of Rajab, they recite a special set of prayers, they will be rewarded by the fulfillment of their wishes.

History 

According to Abu Bakr al-Turtushi (1059 – 1126 CE), the custom of Raghaib prayer was first invented around Jerusalem in the late 11th century; it was promoted by a hadith of doubtful authenticity, whose forgery was attributed by scholars to one Abu'l-Hasan Ali ibn Abd Allah ibn Jahdam (d. 1023). The hadith attributed to Muhammad states:In the early 13th century, a public debate on the Raghaib prayers took place in Damascus between the two Shafi'i scholars ʿIzz ad-Dīn Ibn ʿAbd as-Salām (d. 1262) and Ibn al-Salah (d. 1245). Both agreed on declaring this practice to be a bid'ah (innovation). ʿIzz ad-Dīn branded this custom as unacceptable innovation, while Ibn as-Salāh deemed it bid'ah hasanah (meritorious innovation) as, despite lacking a basis in Prophetic tradition, it encouraged praying. Since most contemporary scholars agreed with ʿIzz ad-Dīn, the Ayyubid Sultan al-Malik al-Kamil forbade the performance of Raghaib prayer in the mosques.

Since most contemporary scholars agreed with ʿIzz ad-Dīn, the Ayyubid Sultan al-Malik al-Kamil forbade the performance of Raghaib prayer in the mosques in 1235. The custom remained popular in the area, however, and the sultanate ultimately permitted it again a few years later, based on Ibn al-Salah's fatwa.

The 15th-century Ottoman scholar Shams al-Din al-Fanari (d. 1430) wrote a treatise defending Raghaib customs. Also, in the Ottoman Empire, the notion spread that on that night Amina bint Wahb, the Prophet's mother, realized that she was about to give birth to a Prophet. Furthermore, before 1588 it became a common custom to light up the minarets on Raghaib night. During the 17th century, the Kadizadeli movement in the Ottoman Empire controversially challenged the permissibility of observing Ragha'ib, as part of their broader anti-innovation ideology; their responses ranged from walking out of the prayer in protest to (in Bursa in 1703) physically attacking the congregation, although by that time Anatolian Muslims widely viewed these prayers as part of canonical Islamic worship. The opponents of the Kadizadelis, on the other hand insisted that these prayers were too deeply rooted in local custom to be banned, and that they attracted people to a life of piety.

From the 18th century, special poems of praise to the Prophet were written for Raghaib night, which were recited with musical accompaniment. These praise poems were called Regaibiyye. The best-known Regaibiyye was the Masnawī Matlau'l-fecr written by Selahaddin Uşşakī (d. 1783).

In religious tradition 
It is believed, the name of the night was given by the angels. Accordingly, when one third of that night has passed, no angel remains in heaven or on the earth, they all gather around the Kaaba. At that moment, God spoke to them and asked them what they want. The angels answered, they wish that God forgives whose who fast on Raghaib. Whereupon God grands the wish. When one third of the first night of Rajab passed, the angels ask for forgiveness for those who fast on the month of Raghaib.

Practice 

It is recommended to fast on Thursday, which coincides with the first Friday night of the month of Rajab. This fasting is held for 2 days, Thursday and Friday. There are also those  who consider it appropriate to fast only on Friday.

It is recommended in this night that those who missed prayer should perform the correction prayers. In the book of Prayers and Dhikrs by Mahmud Sami Ramazanoglu, the nafilah prayer is to be performed on Laylat al-Raghaib as follows:

On the Thursday before Laylat al-Raghaib, twelve rak'ats of supererogatory prayers will be performed to fast, break a few bites of iftar in the evening, and say the evening prayer, then salute every two rak'ahs.

In each rak'ah, after al-Fatiha, al-Qadr will be read three times and Ikhlas will be read twelve times. Alternatively surah al-Qadr is read once and surah "Ikhlas" three times.

After the prayers have been completed, one can then recite the following seventy times:It is recommended to recite the Qur'an on Laylat al-Raghaib. It is further recommended to repent (Tawba) and asking for forgiveness. Performing dua, and remembering to stay in praise and gratitude for the blessings given by God. God is said to sent salawat (greetings) on Muhammad. Another recommended practice is almsgiving (Zakat) in the way of God, and it would transfer the owner of charity to the love of God.

Permissibility 
The permissibility of celebrating Laylat al-Raghaib has been a subject of debate since its first recording in the late 11th century. Shia scholars view participating in the night's religious practices to be permissible. While jurists of the four major Sunni Madhhab, Shafi’i, Hanbali, Hanafi, and Maliki, rely on writing by Al-Nawawi, warning against such practice, stating that the Hadith attributed to Prophet Mohammad is fabricated and observance of such a night is a Bid'ah. Al-Nawawi explained that,The prayer which is known as Salat Al-Raghaib, which is twelve rakahs that are offered between Maghrib and Isha on the night of the first Friday in Rajab, and praying one hundred rakahs on the night of Shaban 15th are both reprehensible innovations. No one should be deceived by the fact that they are mentioned in Qut al-Qulub and Ihya Ulum al-Deen, or by the hadith which is quoted in these two books, because all of that is false. No one should be deceived by some of those imams who were confused about the ruling on these prayers and wrote essays stating that they are recommended, for they are mistaken in that. Imam Abu Muhammad Abd al-Rahman ibn Ismail al-Maqdisi wrote a valuable book showing that they are false, and he did well in that, may Allah have mercy on him.

Popular custom 
In Turkey, this and other Kandil nights were traditionally marked by cooking lokma and baking a small round loaf.

References

Raghaib
Islamic belief and doctrine
Islamic terminology